Arun Rupesh Maini (Hindi: अरुण रूपेश मैनी;  ; born ), better known as Mrwhosetheboss, is a British YouTuber who is best known for his technology-related content. His two YouTube channels have collectively earned over  million subscribers and  billion views.

Career 
Maini claimed in an interview that he originally started uploading video game content to YouTube; when he was 14 years old, his brother gave him his first smartphone and Maini decided to make a video about it. From there, he turned his attention to creating smartphone videos, which ultimately lead to the trajectory of his channel. Maini initially focused on videos about smartphones, including smartphone reviews. As the channel's following increased, Maini expanded his video premises to cover laptops, speakers, and even a vacuum cleaner. He also has made videos where he gives his honest thoughts about topics such as sarcastic marketing by smartphone companies. 

In 2015, Maini uploaded his first viral video which was a tutorial on creating a makeshift 3D hologram projector by crafting a pyramid composed of reflective material and placing it on a smartphone screen. The video received coverage from The Daily Dot and CNBC. The video is still his most viewed YouTube video.

In May 2021, Maini signed with Night Media. In September 2022, Maini released a video claiming that Samsung phones may have problems with swelling batteries after he found that his Samsung Galaxy Note 8, Samsung Galaxy S6, and Samsung Galaxy S10 had all experienced the issue. Similar claims were corroborated in the video by YouTuber Marques Brownlee

Personal Life 
Arun Rupesh Maini was born on 24 October 1995 in Nottingham, England. As a child, he attended two schools. On weekdays, he would attend a regular English school, and, on weekends, he would attended Hindi school, in order to learn the Hindi language. On 6 February 2023, Maini got engaged to his girlfriend, Dhrisha.

Awards and nominations

Notes

References

External links 

Living people
Technology YouTubers
Year of birth missing (living people)
Internet memes
Viral videos
English YouTubers
Streamy Award winners